The Singer Vogue name has been applied to two generations of motor cars from the British manufacturer Singer.

Vogue Series I/II/III/IV

The first generation Singer Vogue I/II/III/IV models of 1961 to 1966, was a badge engineered version of the Hillman Super Minx. Introduced in July 1961, it was positioned above the Super Minx and Singer Gazelle in the Rootes Group range, and had quadruple headlights as well as a more powerful  version of the  Minx engine. The Series II version for 1963 had front disc brakes as standard, changes to the interior, removal of the chrome bonnet strip and a change to amber front indicator lenses. The final version of this generation, the Series IV was introduced at the 1965 motor show and saw the engine size increased to  although there was no change in power output. The first generation Vogue was offered as a four door saloon and as an estate car.

Australian production as the Humber Vogue

The Vogue was also produced in Australia, by Rootes Australia, and was marketed as the Humber Vogue. The Vogue Sports also featured improved suspension, brakes and wheels. The Rapier-powered Vogue III was introduced in early 1965 at which time the Vogue Sports was discontinued. Australian production of the Vogue ceased in 1966 following the takeover of Rootes Australia by Chrysler Australia.

New Vogue

The second generation Singer New Vogue launched at the 1966 British International Motor Show, was a badge engineered version of the Rootes Arrow saloon. More upmarket than the Hillman Hunter, it was powered by the same  engine and was the first British car to feature rectangular headlamps. An estate version was released in April 1967. In New Zealand, Todd Motors produced a Singer Vogue as an up-market version of the Hunter. Prime differences were its wooden dashboard and door cappings. Along with all other Singer models the Vogue was discontinued in 1970 to be replaced by the short lived Sunbeam Vogue.

Scale models
Meccano Dinky Toys; No. 145 (production 1962–66), Series 1 Vogue, approximately O scale (1:44).

References

Vogue
Cars introduced in 1961
1970s cars
Rear-wheel-drive vehicles
Sedans
Station wagons